Patricia is an unincorporated community in Bennett County, in the U.S. state of South Dakota.

History
Patricia was laid out in 1927, and named in honor of Patricia Tutsch, the wife of a first settler. A post office called Patricia was established in 1927, and remained in operation until 1955.

References

Unincorporated communities in Bennett County, South Dakota
Unincorporated communities in South Dakota